Durham County Cricket Club is one of the 18 member clubs of the English County Championship, representing the historic county of Durham.  The club was established on 23 May 1882. The county entered the Minor Counties Championship in 1895 and competed with great success in the competition until 1991, after which it was elevated to first-class status for the 1992 season, and has played first-class cricket since. While still a minor county, Durham first played List A cricket in 1964, and has played Twenty20 cricket since 2003.

The Racecourse Ground in Durham staged the club's first home fixture in first-class cricket in 1992 which was against Leicestershire, while Feethams played host to the club's first home List A match in 1964, a match against Hertfordshire, with the Riverside Ground in Chester-le-Street being the venue for the club's first Twenty20 match in 2003, the game against Nottinghamshire. Durham have played home matches at 22 grounds, but have played the majority of their home fixtures since elevation to first-class status at the Riverside Ground, which also holds Test, One Day International and Twenty20 International cricket matches.

The 22 grounds that Durham have used for home matches since 1895 are listed below, with statistics complete through to the end of the 2014 season.

Grounds

Minor county
Below is a complete list of grounds used by Durham County Cricket Club in Minor Counties Championship and MCCA Knockout Trophy matches before its elevation to first-class status in 1992. The list excludes List A matches played by Durham when they were a minor county

First-class county
Below is a complete list of grounds used by Durham County Cricket Club in first-class, List A and Twenty20 matches following its elevation to first-class status in 1992. The table includes List A matches played by Durham when they were a minor county

Notes

References

Durham County Cricket Club
Cricket grounds in County Durham
Durham
Lists of buildings and structures in County Durham